Dora Heyenn (born 16 May 1949 in Kopendorf on Fehmarn) is a German biology and chemistry teacher and politician of Germany's Left Party and member of the state parliament of Hamburg, who Heyenn isn't a member of the Left party parliamentary group.

Political career
From 1971 on a member of the SPD, she was a member of the SPD's executive board in Germany's federal state of Schleswig-Holstein from 1979 until 1983. In 1990 she moved up to become a member of the Landtag of Schleswig-Holstein.

In 1999, she left the social democrats over her rejection of Chancellor Schröder's Hartz reforms. In 2005, she became a founding member of the WASG which eventually merged to become Die Linke in Germany.

In the 2008 state election, she led her party for the first time into representation in the German federal state of Hamburg and since then has been a member of the Hamburg Parliament. Following the 2011 state elections, she became parliamentary leader of her party. In 2012, Heyenn ran for co-leadership in the federal party, but with just above 29 percent lost to fellow candidate Katja Kipping who received 67 percent. In the 2015 Hamburg state elections she was again list leader of her party.

References

External links 
 Profile on her party's page
 Biography on the page of the Schleswig-Holstein Parliament

1949 births
Living people
Social Democratic Party of Germany politicians
Members of the Landtag of Schleswig-Holstein
Members of the Hamburg Parliament
The Left (Germany) politicians
21st-century German politicians
Women members of State Parliaments in Germany
21st-century German women politicians